Alexis Manuel Frutos Vaesken (17 October 1934 – 18 March 1996) was a Paraguayan lawyer and diplomat.

He studied law at the National University of Asunción.

He served as Foreign Minister of Paraguay under Andrés Rodríguez Pedotti (1990-1993).

References

External links
 Minister Frutos Vaesken

1934 births
1996 deaths
Universidad Nacional de Asunción alumni
Academic staff of Universidad Nacional de Asunción
Paraguayan diplomats
Foreign Ministers of Paraguay
20th-century Paraguayan lawyers